Maik Nawrocki (7 February 2001) is a Polish professional footballer who plays as a centre-back for Ekstraklasa club Legia Warsaw. He is a Polish youth international.

Club career
Nawrocki is a homegrown product of Werder Bremen's youth system, joining the club at the age of 5. He progressed to the reserve team playing in the Regionalliga Nord, and in February 2020 signed a professional contract with Werder Bremen.

Nawrocki joined Warta Poznań on loan in February 2021 after the Regionalliga Nord was postponed. He played three times for Warta in the Ekstraklasa, scoring one goal.

On 15 June 2021, it was announced that Nawrocki would be returning to Poland, joining reigning champions Legia Warsaw on loan for the 2021–22 season with an option to make the deal permanent. He joined Legia permanently on a three-year deal on 28 May 2022.

International career
Nawrocki has represented Poland internationally at youth levels U15 through U21.

Career statistics

References

External links
 

2001 births
Living people
Footballers from Bremen
Polish footballers
Polish people of German descent
German people of Polish descent
Citizens of Poland through descent
Association football defenders
Poland youth international footballers
Poland under-21 international footballers
SV Werder Bremen players
SV Werder Bremen II players
Warta Poznań players
Legia Warsaw players
Ekstraklasa players